Tiriyo, Tiriyó, or Trió may refer to:
 Tiriyó people, an ethnic group of Brazil and Suriname
 Tiriyó language, their language

See also 
 
 Missão Tiriyó, a village
 Tirio (disambiguation)
 Trio (disambiguation)

Language and nationality disambiguation pages